Citizens Bank Park is a baseball stadium located in Philadelphia, Pennsylvania, in the city's South Philadelphia Sports Complex. It is the home playing field of the Philadelphia Phillies, the city's Major League Baseball (MLB) franchise. The stadium opened April 3, 2004, and hosted its first regular season baseball game on April 12 of the same year, with the Phillies losing to the Cincinnati Reds, 4–1. It is named after Citizens Financial Group.

The ballpark was built to replace the 33-year-old, now-demolished Veterans Stadium, a multipurpose football and baseball facility that was demolished in 2004. Citizens Bank Park features a natural grass-and-dirt playing field and a number of Philadelphia-style food stands that serve cheesesteak sandwiches, hoagies, Tastykakes, soft pretzels, Yards, Yuengling beer, and many other regional specialties. The ballpark lies on the northeast corner of the Sports Complex, which includes Lincoln Financial Field, the Wells Fargo Center, and Xfinity Live!, the Center's adjacent theme park and food court. The stadium seats 42,792.

History

Planning

In 1999, the Phillies and the Philadelphia Eagles of the NFL joined their western Pennsylvania counterparts, the Pittsburgh Pirates and Pittsburgh Steelers, in making requests to replace both Veterans Stadium and Three Rivers Stadium in Pittsburgh with separate baseball and football stadiums. Pressure for new Philadelphia stadiums increased after a railing collapsed at “The Vet”, as Veterans Stadium was commonly known, during the 1998 Army–Navy Game, injuring eight cadets. The Pirates threatened to leave Pittsburgh in 1997, helping to convince the state legislature to approve funding for the four proposed stadiums. With their architectural plans already in place, Allegheny County and the City of Pittsburgh approved the pacts swiftly, but debate in Philadelphia's city leadership continued even as Pittsburgh opened its stadiums (PNC Park for the Pirates and Heinz Field for the Steelers) in 2001. The Eagles ultimately agreed to the site of a former food warehouse slightly southeast of Veterans Stadium. Lincoln Financial Field celebrated its grand opening in August 2003.

The Phillies originally sought to build a downtown ballpark similar to Baltimore's, Denver's, Cincinnati's, Cleveland's, Detroit's and San Francisco's. Various locations were proposed, including Broad and Spring Garden streets; Spring Garden and Delaware Avenue; and next to 30th Street Station on the site of the former main post office. The team and the city announced that the site would be at 13th and Vine streets in Chinatown, just north of Interstate 676, within walking distance of Center City. There was considerable support for a downtown ball park from business and labor and the city at large. But Chinatown residents protested, fearing a new ballpark would destroy their neighborhood. The City and team eventually settled on building at the South Philadelphia Sports Complex on the site of another abandoned food warehouse. In the years that followed, residents, fans, and owner Bill Giles expressed regret that the new ball park was not located in Center City Philadelphia. Regardless of location, however, the team set attendance records in 2010 (3,647,249 fans, averaging 45,028) with all home games sold out for the first time in the team's long history (81), extending a sellout streak dating back to July of 2009 to 123.

Chief architect of the new stadium was EwingCole's Stanley Cole. Unveiling of the new park's design and ground breaking ceremonies took place on June 28, 2001. Following the game that evening, the location of the left-field foul pole,  from home plate, was unveiled at the outset of the team's annual Fourth of July fireworks display. On June 17, 2003, Citizens Bank agreed to a 25-year, US $95 million deal for the park's naming rights and advertising on billboards, telecasts, radio broadcasts, and publications. The ballpark was officially topped off on August 12, 2003, and opened in April 2004.

Modifications
Shortly after the park opened in 2004, the bullpens were reassigned so the Phillies' pitchers used the lower pen and visitors used the upper pen.  This was done to give Phillies' pitchers a better view of the game and to protect them from heckling by fans. However, the team forgot to rewire the bullpen phones after the bullpens were reassigned, so during the first game, the dugout coaches had to communicate with the bullpens by hand signals.

In its first years, Citizens Bank Park allowed 218 home runs in 2004 and 201 in 2005.  More than half of those home runs were to left-field.  Following the 2005 season, the left-field wall was moved back .

Even with these modifications, the park has a reputation as one of the most hitter-friendly parks in baseball.  In 2009, it gave up 149 home runs, the most in the National League and second in the majors behind only the new Yankee Stadium, but has been neutral since, with a .997 park factor in 2011.

Significant events

April 12, 2004, 1:32pm: Randy Wolf of the Phillies threw the first regular season pitch ever at Citizens Bank Park to D'Angelo Jiménez of the Cincinnati Reds, who got the park's first hit, a lead-off ground-rule double. Jiménez scored the park's first run later in the inning on a wild pitch. Bobby Abreu of the Phillies hit the first home run in the bottom of the first inning, which also served as the franchise's first hit at Citizens Bank Park. Reds pitcher Paul Wilson earned the first win in that game and Danny Graves earned the park's first save.
June 14, 2004: Phillies first baseman Jim Thome hit his 400th career home run into the left-center field seats at Citizens Bank Park. The home run came before a 2 hour 18 minute rain delay that started when the game was not yet official. The teams waited out that delay and two more to eventually finish the game at 2:06 am.
June 20, 2004: The first inside-the-park home run at the stadium was hit by Jimmy Rollins against the Kansas City Royals.
April 4, 2005: The Washington Nationals played their first regular season game as a new team after moving from Montreal at Citizens Bank Park, and the Phillies won the game 8-4.
May 9, 2005: In a Minor League Baseball game, the Eastern League Reading Phillies hosted the Trenton Thunder at Citizens Bank park; Reading beat Trenton 5–3.
The ball landed in the upper deck in left field.
July 15, 2007: The Phillies lost their 10,000th regular-season game in their history to the St. Louis Cardinals, 10–2, marking the first time a professional sports franchise reached that plateau.
October 25, 2008: The park hosted its first World Series game, and the Phillies defeatedg the Tampa Bay Rays, 5–4 in Game 3. The elder McGraw died from a brain tumor on January 5, 2004. Four days later, the Phillies completed a suspended Game 5, defeating the Rays, 4–3, winning the 2008 World Series, the franchise's second World Series championship, in front of a park record crowd of 45,940. The Phillies held their post-parade celebration at the park on October 31.
June 25, 2010: Citizens Bank Park hosted the first regular-season game in a National League stadium in which the designated hitter was used; Major League Baseball moved the Phillies' series against the Toronto Blue Jays from Rogers Centre to Philadelphia, citing security concerns for the G-20 Summit. Ryan Howard served as the first DH in a National League ballpark. Despite playing in their park, Philadelphia was designated as the road team.
October 6, 2010: The first no-hitter at Citizens Bank Park was thrown by Roy Halladay against the Cincinnati Reds in the first game of the 2010 NLDS.
April 16, 2019: Major League Baseball announced that Citizens Bank Park would host the 2026 Major League Baseball All-Star Game to commemorate the 250th anniversary of the signing of the Declaration of Independence.
November 2, 2022: In the fourth game of the 2022 World Series, Houston Astros starting pitcher Cristian Javier combined with bullpen relief from Bryan Abreu, Rafael Montero, and Ryan Pressly threw a no-hitter, the first one in a World Series since Don Larsen's perfect game in 1956.

Features

Ashburn Alley

Behind center field is Ashburn Alley, named after Phillies Hall of Fame center fielder Richie Ashburn, who played for the team from 1948 to 1959 and was a Phillies broadcaster from 1963 until his death in 1997.  It is seen by Phillies fans as a compromise between the Phillies and their fans, many of whom wanted Citizens Bank Park named in honor of Ashburn.

Ashburn Alley is named for the slightly-overgrown grass which bordered the third base line at Shibe Park where Ashburn was famous for laying down bunts that stayed fair. The new Ashburn Alley, located near Ashburn's defensive position, is a walkway featuring restaurants, games and memorabilia from Phillies history.  Ashburn Alley also features a memorabilia shop and a large bronze statue of Ashburn directly behind center field, as well as the U.S. flag, the flags of the Commonwealth of Pennsylvania and the City of Philadelphia, a POW/MIA flag and the flags from the Phillies' championships.

Features of the Alley are:

All-Star Walk: Granite markers pay tribute to Phillies players that have played in the MLB All-Star Game since its inception in 1933 and runs the length of Ashburn Alley.
Budweiser Batter's Eye: Offers a full lineup of Anheuser-Busch products
Bull's BBQ: Relocated to left side of the scoreboard, out of the Alley (in the new "Boardwalk Eats" section), it is named in honor of and owned in part by former Phillies outfielder Greg "The Bull" Luzinski. This southern-style barbecue features ribs, turkey legs along with pork, beef and chicken sandwiches and "Bulldogs" (kielbasa).
Chickie's & Pete's: Famous for their Crab Fries, a seasoned crinkle fry served with a cheese dipping sauce.
Campo's: Philadelphia cheesesteaks, replaced Rick's Steaks in 2009. The original Campo's opened in 1947.
Exposed Bullpens: Located in right-center field, the bi-level bullpens allow the fans to get very close to the players (especially the visiting team, who sit in the top level). Fans are allowed to heckle but must keep it clean. The section above the bullpen that contains the Phillies Wall of Fame is closed to the public about 30 minutes prior to first pitch and remains closed throughout the game, re-opening at the game's conclusion.
Games of Baseball: Sponsored by Citizens Financial Group, this interactive area features a video trivia game, where players compete for prizes, a run-the-bases game with the Phillie Phanatic, and a "Ring 'Em Up" game (formerly a "Pitch 'Em and Tip 'Em" game) where you can throw at targets of a catcher. Players earn coupons and exchange them for prizes at a kiosk such as hats, shirts and other ballpark-imprinted memorabilia.
Harry The K's Bar and Grille, Named for late Phillies broadcaster Harry Kalas, the bi-level bar and grill is built into the base of the scoreboard, and serves finger foods and sandwiches, including "The Schmitter", named for former Phillies third baseman Mike Schmidt
Jim Beam Bourbon Bar: Features Jim Beam cocktails and a large selection of local, craft, domestic, and imported beers
Manco & Manco: An Ocean City, New Jersey, pizza franchise that took over for Seasons Pizza starting in the 2022 season
Memory Lane and Phillies Wall of Fame: A history of baseball in Philadelphia is located behind the brick batting eye in center field, while the opposite wall commemorates members of the franchise who contributed to the franchise's history. Second baseman Chase Utley's homer was also into this area against the Astros on April 23, 2007, clearing the center wall and becoming only the second player to reach the Memory Lane area after Howard.
P.J. Whelihan's: A pub and restaurant franchise specializing in wings. This location serves boneless wings, wraps, fries, and nachos
Rooftop Bleachers: Inspired by the 1920s and 1930s stands on North 20th Street outside Shibe Park, this area replicates the seating similar to that outside Wrigley Field in Chicago. During the 2008 season, fans could go on top for $15 on Thursday home dates and get special food offers and events.
Starting Lineup (2004–2017): The Phillies starting lineup that day was illustrated by giant  by  baseball cards as fans entered the left field gate.
Tony Luke's: Tony Luke's famous cheesesteaks and roast pork

In 2004 and 2005, organist Paul Richardson performed from Ashburn Alley, as Citizens Bank Park was built without an organ booth.

Other attractions
Diamond and Hall of Fame Clubs: Two premium seating areas in the park. The Diamond Club, located behind home plate, includes an air-conditioned indoor club area with exclusive food and souvenir shops where ticket holders can watch batting practice on either side of the club (especially on rainy days). There are a total of 1,164 seats in the Diamond Club. A second level, called the Hall of Fame Club, is located between Sections 212 through 232. This air-conditioned area features exclusive food and souvenir stands akin to The Diamond Club, and also houses memorabilia from the teams' past going back to the 1880s, along with memorabilia from the Philadelphia Athletics. The Hall of Fame Club contains 6,600 seats. In addition to being an attraction to fans, the Hall of Fame level also houses the A/V crew on the first-base side of that level that controls the scoreboard and all other monitors throughout the park and is where Dan Baker announces the game, as well as the press box, television, and radio booths.
High and Inside Pub: Located on the Terrace Level behind home plate, the area is open to groups before the ballgame, and the public once the games start.
In recent years, the Phillies have promoted the hashtag "#RingTheBell".
New Era Phillies Team Store and '47 Alley Store: The team store is open year-round, and serves as the starting point for tours of the ballpark. The bi-level store features regular merchandise on the first level and player jerseys as well as Phanatic-themed items on the second level, while the Alley Store is open during all home games and features authentic replicas of older Phillies jerseys made by the famous Philadelphia retailer of vintage uniform shirts and caps, Mitchell and Ness, as well as other items. During the off-season, customizable jerseys are available in the main store when a stand next to the store is open during the season.
McFadden's Bar and Grille: Open year-round, this restaurant combined the McFadden's and Zanzibar Blue menus at the Third Base Gate. Since its opening, it has become a popular post-game (or event) site for the nearby Wells Fargo Center and Lincoln Financial Field. Closed in 2018.
Pass and Stow: Located at the former site of McFadden's Bar and Grille. Pass and Stow is an indoor bar and restaurant while also consisting of an outdoor bar and pizza oven.  It is located inside of the entrance of the third base gate. Opened in 2019.
Phanatic Phun Zone: Located at the First Base Gate plaza, this playground offers fun for guests eight years old and younger with slides, climb, explore and play games. A separate area for toddlers three years old and younger is found inside.

Statues

In addition to the Richie Ashburn statue in Ashburn Alley, statues of three other famous Phillies, Robin Roberts (at the First Base Gate), Mike Schmidt (at the Third Base Gate), and Steve Carlton (at the Left Field Gate), are located outside of the facility. Each of the  statues were made by local sculptor Zenos Frudakis and cast at Laran Bronze in nearby Chester. Other art found throughout the park includes tile mosaics, murals and terrazzo floors with outlined images of famous players in Phillies history.

In April 2011, the Phillies accepted a gift of a fan-underwritten  bronze statue of legendary broadcaster Harry Kalas.  Created by noted local sculptor Lawrence Nowlan and cast at Laran Bronze, it was placed behind Section 141, near the restaurant that bears Kalas' name, after a dedication held on August 16, 2011 prior to that night's game against the Arizona Diamondbacks.  The statue was unveiled two days later than originally scheduled (the originally-scheduled date is on a plaque on the ground below the statue) because of a rained-out game between the Phillies and the Washington Nationals.

Green stadium
The Philadelphia Phillies are the first Major League Baseball team to join the Environmental Protection Agency's Green Power Partnership Program which motivates organizations across the world to purchase green power in order to minimize environmental impact. The Phillies announced on April 30, 2008, that their home field, Citizens Bank Park, will be powered with 20 million kilowatt-hours (kWh) of green energy purchased in Green-e Energy Certified Renewable Certificates (RECs). The EPA stated that this purchase holds the record in professional sports for the largest purchase of 100% renewable energy.
The Phillies are among the top three purchasers of green power in Philadelphia, and the executive director of the Center for Resource Solutions, Arthur O'Donnell, wants "other clubs to take their lead." Aramark Corporation is the Phillies' food and beverage provider at Citizens Bank Park and they are taking major actions in improving the environmental impact of the Phillies' stadium. Glass, cardboard and plastics used during game day are recycled; frying oil is being recycled to produce biodiesel fuel, and biodegradable, recyclable, and compostable products, serviceware, and plastics have been introduced.

Non-baseball events

Ice hockey

On January 2, 2012, Citizens Bank Park hosted the fifth annual NHL Winter Classic between long time division rivals New York Rangers and Philadelphia Flyers before an SRO crowd of 46,967. The game, which was televised throughout the United States and Canada by NBC and CBC respectively, was won by the Rangers, 3–2. Two days earlier, on New Year's Eve, 45,667 attended an alumni game played between teams made up of former Flyers and Rangers who had retired from the NHL between the 1970s and 2011 of which eight (four on each team) were also members of the Hockey Hall of Fame. The Flyers' starting goalie for the game, which was won by the Flyers alumni, 3–1, was Hall of Famer Bernie Parent. He made his first on ice appearance since his playing career ended prematurely due to an eye injury suffered during a game against the Rangers played at the neighboring (although since demolished) Spectrum in February 1979.

Four days after the 2012 NHL Winter Classic game, a third sell out crowd of 45,663 filled the Park on January 6 to watch the Flyers' AHL farm team, the Adirondack Phantoms, defeat the Hershey Bears, 4–3, in overtime. That crowd exceeded by a factor of more than two the previous largest gathering (21,673) to ever attend an AHL game since the league was established in 1936. With the normal 43,651 baseball seating capacity of the Park having been increased by more than 3,000 with the installation of temporary bleachers built over the bullpen area in center field, the trio of outdoor hockey games drew a combined total of 138,296 over the week of Winter Classic events.

Concerts
The first concert at the park was Jimmy Buffett & The Coral Reefer Band on August 25, 2005; they returned on June 14, 2008.

The Eagles, The Dixie Chicks and Keith Urban were scheduled to perform on June 14, 2010, but the show was cancelled.

Other stadium information
Dan Baker, public address announcer for the Phillies since 1972, continues to introduce the players.  During each player's first at-bat, Baker, in an excited voice, says, "Now batting for the Phillies, number (#), (position), (player's name)".

For example, a first at-bat introduction would have Baker say, "Now batting for the Phillies, number 11, shortstop Jimmy Rollins!"  During subsequent at-bats, players are only announced by their position and name, for example, "Phillies first baseman, Ryan Howard!"

Baker only uses the city of the opposing team when he announces their players rather than the team nickname, for example, "Now batting for Atlanta, number ten, third baseman Chipper Jones", and makes the announcement in a more-subdued tone.

Video boards
In 2004 and 2005, Citizens Bank Park installed Daktronics video and message displays in the park. One of the largest incandescent displays in Major League Baseball was installed in left field that was used as a scoreboard and for giving statistics. During the 2010–2011 offseason, the Phillies replaced their incandescent scoreboard with a new HD scoreboard that cost $10 million.

Accolades
The food at Citizens Bank Park was named the Best Ballpark Food in a survey of Food Network viewers in the first annual Food Network Awards, which first aired on the network on April 22, 2007. 

In 2007, PETA rated Citizens Bank Park as America's most vegetarian-friendly ballpark; the stadium was given the same honor in five of the next seven years as well.

Photo gallery

See also

List of Major League Baseball stadiums
List of Major League Baseball spring-training stadiums
Jefferson Street Grounds (Philadelphia) (site of first game in history of Major League Baseball)

References

External links

Citizens Bank: Citizens Bank Park
Stadium site on MLB.com
Ballparks.com: Citizens Bank Park
Proposal and Timeline
Ballparks of Baseball: Citizens Bank Park
Baseball Pilgrimages: Citizens Bank Park
Ballpark Reviews: Citizens Bank Park

2004 establishments in Pennsylvania
Baseball venues in Pennsylvania
Buildings and structures completed in 2004
Ice hockey venues in Pennsylvania
Major League Baseball venues
Outdoor ice hockey venues in the United States
Philadelphia Phillies stadiums
Populous (company) buildings
Rugby league in Pennsylvania
Rugby league stadiums in the United States
South Philadelphia
Sports venues completed in 2004
Sports venues in Philadelphia